Catilla is a genus of fungus in the family Cyphellaceae.

References 

Cyphellaceae
Agaricales genera